Cedar County is a county located in the U.S. state of Iowa. As of the 2020 census, the population was 18,505. Its county seat is Tipton. The county is named for the Cedar River, which runs through the county.

Cedar County is located between the Cedar Rapids, Quad Cities and Iowa City metropolitan areas, areas also known as the "Tri-Metro" county. It is the only Iowa county which shares the name of a tree. Cedar County was the focus of the Iowa Cow War of 1931.

History
Cedar County was formed on December 21, 1837, from sections of Dubuque County. It was named for the Cedar River.

In 1840, the City of Tipton, the current county seat, was established.

Before the Civil War, the area around West Branch was an active focal point of the Underground Railroad, a network for the freeing of slaves from the southern states.

The former US President Herbert Hoover (1874-1964) was born in West Branch in Cedar County.

The Cedar County Sheriff's House and Jail is believed to be the last jail and residence combination still in use when it closed in 2001.  It was listed on the National Register of Historic Places in 2003.

Geography
Rock Creek flows through Cedar County.

Major highways
 Interstate 80
 U.S. Highway 6
 U.S. Highway 30
 Iowa Highway 38
 Iowa Highway 130

Adjacent counties
Jones County (north)
Clinton County (northeast)
Scott County (southeast)
Muscatine County (south)
Johnson County (west)
Linn County (northwest)

National protected area
 Herbert Hoover National Historic Site

Demographics

2020 census
There were 8,190 housing units of which 7,594 were occupied.

2010 census
There were 8,064 housing units, of which 7,511 were occupied.

2000 census

As of the census of 2000, there were 18,187 people, 7,147 households, and 5,138 families residing in the county.  The population density was 31 people per square mile (12/km2).  There were 7,570 housing units at an average density of 13 per square mile (5/km2).  The racial makeup of the county was 98.47% White, 0.19% Black or African American, 0.19% Native American, 0.30% Asian, 0.03% Pacific Islander, 0.26% from other races, and 0.57% from two or more races.  0.94% of the population were Hispanic or Latino of any race.

There were 7,147 households, out of which 33.30% had children under the age of 18 living with them, 61.60% were married couples living together, 6.70% had a female householder with no husband present, and 28.10% were non-families. 23.70% of all households were made up of individuals, and 11.90% had someone living alone who was 65 years of age or older.  The average household size was 2.51 and the average family size was 2.96.

In the county, the population was spread out, with 25.30% under the age of 18, 6.90% from 18 to 24, 27.70% from 25 to 44, 23.80% from 45 to 64, and 16.20% who were 65 years of age or older.  The median age was 39 years. For every 100 females there were 97.50 males.  For every 100 females age 18 and over, there were 94.60 males.

The median income for a household in the county was $42,198, and the median income for a family was $48,850. Males had a median income of $32,008 versus $23,260 for females. The per capita income for the county was $19,200.  About 4.00% of families and 5.50% of the population were below the poverty line, including 5.00% of those under age 18 and 7.70% of those age 65 or over.

Communities

Cities

Bennett
Clarence
Durant
Lowden
Mechanicsville
Stanwood
Tipton
West Branch
Wilton

Census-designated place
Rochester

Unincorporated communities

Buchanan
Cedar Bluff
Cedar Valley
Centerdale
Downey
Lime City
Plato
Massillon
Springdale
Sunbury
Wald

Townships
Cedar County is divided into seventeen townships:

 Cass
 Center
 Dayton
 Fairfield
 Farmington
 Fremont
 Gower
 Inland
 Iowa
 Linn
 Massillon
 Pioneer
 Red Oak
 Rochester
 Springdale
 Springfield
 Sugar Creek

Population ranking
The population ranking of the following table is based on the 2020 census of Cedar County.
† county seat

Notable people

 Herbert Hoover (1874–1964), the 31st President of the United States (1929–1933) and the first president born west of the Mississippi River (born in West Branch in 1874).
 John Brown (1800–1859), abolitionist, maintained his headquarters at William Maxson's house near the small community of Springdale in Cedar County while planning his Harpers Ferry raid; Edwin and Barclay Coppock of Springdale participated in the raid.
 Lawrie Tatum (1822–1900), an Indian Agent to the Kiowa and Comanche tribes and, beginning in 1884, guardian to future President Herbert Hoover.

Politics

See also

National Register of Historic Places listings in Cedar County, Iowa

References

External links

Official Cedar County Government website
Cedar County Economic Development Commission

 
1837 establishments in Wisconsin Territory
Populated places established in 1837